Westringia capitonia is a species of plant in the mint family that is endemic to Western Australia.

Description
The species grows as a shrub. The leaves are 4–20 mm long and 0.8–1.7 mm wide. The flowers are white, appearing in December.

Distribution and habitat
The species occurs in the Avon Wheatbelt IBRA bioregion of Southwest Australia.

References

capitonia
Lamiales of Australia
Eudicots of Western Australia
Plants described in 2009